Righetti is an Italian language surname.  Notable people with the surname include:

Alex Righetti (born 1977), Italian former basketball player
Amanda Righetti (born 1983), American actress and film producer
Benjamin Righetti (born 1982), Swiss musician
Caryl Righetti (born 1984), Swiss footballer
Dave Righetti (born 1958), American baseball coach and former player, son of Leo Righetti
Francesco Righetti, also known in Spanish as Francisco Righetti (1835–1917), Swiss architect
Geltrude Righetti (1793–1862), Italian opera singer
Joe Righetti (born 1947), former American football player
John Righetti, president and spokesman of the Carpatho-Rusyn Society
Leo Righetti (1925–1998), American baseball player, father of Dave Righetti
Mario Righetti (born c. 1590), Italian painter
Mattia Righetti (born 1980), Italian rower
Oscar Righetti (born 1948), retired Italian footballer
Oscar Righetti (born 1960), Canadian Union President/United Steelworkers of America/Sherwin Williams
Pier Giorgio Righetti (born 1941), Italian chemist
Pietro Righetti (1899–2001), Italian racing cyclist
Samuele Righetti (born 2001), Italian footballer
Timo Righetti (born 1998), Swiss footballer 
Ubaldo Righetti (born 1963), Italian footballer

See also
Ernest Righetti High School, one of the four primary high schools of the Santa Maria Joint Union High School District in California.
Palazzo Orsini Pio Righetti, a palace in Rome

Italian-language surnames